Eugene Charles "Gene" Hart (June 28, 1931 – July 14, 1999) was an American sports announcer for the Philadelphia Flyers of the National Hockey League and the Philadelphia Phantoms of the American Hockey League.

Biography
Hart was born in New York City in 1931 and soon moved to Southern New Jersey, where he graduated from Pleasantville High School in Pleasantville, New Jersey. He graduated from Trenton State College with a Bachelor of Arts degree in Education. After serving time in the military, Hart began officiating high school football, baseball, and basketball in South Jersey. After one game at Atlantic City High School, the school's athletic broadcaster Ralph Glenn was walking around frantically to find a person to go with him to Trenton to announce a game. He explained his situation to Hart and Hart agreed to go with him, which began his announcing career in hockey.

Professional career
Hart continued to announce with Glenn on a regular basis in Southern New Jersey, and kept several side jobs as well, including teaching high school history classes in Medford, New Jersey and Audubon, New Jersey. When Philadelphia was granted an NHL expansion team in 1966, Hart submitted his tapes to the team, which would be called the Flyers. Since the Flyers could not afford one of the more experienced Canadian announcers, Hart got the job. Although he only expected to be on the staff for a few years until the Flyers could afford a better broadcaster, Hart stayed on as the voice of the Philadelphia Flyers for 29 years, from the team's inception until the end of the 1994–1995 season. Hart's colleagues as a Flyers announcer included Stu Nahan and Don Earle. Known for his rapid fire delivery, Hart's style was heavily influenced by famous hockey broadcaster Foster Hewitt. Like Hewitt, Hart's slightly high pitched, action describing delivery was perfect for both radio and early generation sports television.  Hart announced more than 2,000 NHL games, 6 separate Stanley Cups, 5 NHL all-star games, and the NHL Soviet Union all-star series. His most famous call came when he announced the end of Game 6 of the 1974 Stanley Cup Finals: 

Gene Hart's call triggered the biggest celebration in Philadelphia sports history. More than 2 million attended the parade celebrating the Flyers' win.

His signature goal call was: 
 
Tasty Baking Company was (and still is as of 2020) a Flyers sponsor and awarded a case of their desserts whenever a Flyer scored.  The cases are usually given to charity in the player's name.

In the early 1980s, he was also one of the voices of the NHL on USA Network. His signature phrase, which he used at the end of games, was "Good night and good hockey!" Hart succeeded Hall of Famer Roy Shudt as the announcer at Brandywine Raceway in Wilmington, DE in 1984.  He called the horse races there until the track closed in 1989.

Hart and hockey historian Bruce C. Cooper co-authored "The Hockey Trivia Book" published by Leisure Press in 1984, and his autobiography entitled "SCORE!" (co-authored with Buzz Ringe) was published by Bonus Books in 1990. A feature-length documentary film about Hart's life entitled "All Hart" is currently in production by Green Creek Films.

Hart did the play-by-play for the 1973 Finals of the North American Soccer League between the Philadelphia Atoms and the Dallas Tornado. Future USMNT coach Walter Chyzowych provided color commentary.

Post broadcasting career
Hart was inducted into the Hockey Hall of Fame in November 1997, receiving the Foster Hewitt Memorial Award. He came out of retirement in 1997 to announce for the Philadelphia Phantoms, the Flyers’ minor league affiliate. He announced the team's Calder Cup championship series before retiring at the end of the 1999 season. Hart also was the host of a little-known local radio talk show on WBCB 1490 AM in Bucks County, Pennsylvania. It featured former and current Flyers players and coaches as well as players from the minor league Philadelphia Phantoms.

Death and family
Gene Hart died from a variety of illnesses on July 14, 1999. He had been a resident of Cherry Hill, New Jersey.

Hart's daughter, Lauren Hart, is a professional recording artist, and regular performer of "The Star-Spangled Banner" and "O Canada" before many Flyers home games. She also performs a duet of "God Bless America" with a taped version of Kate Smith on several occasions, especially big games, among them games in the 2010 Stanley Cup Finals. She wears number 68 on her Flyers jersey to honor the age of her father when he died.
The Broadcast Pioneers of Philadelphia inducted Gene Hart into their Hall of Fame in 2001.

References

External links
 Hockey Hall of Fame Induction 
 Broadcast Pioneers of Philadelphia

1931 births
1999 deaths
Pleasantville High School (New Jersey) alumni
The College of New Jersey alumni
Philadelphia Flyers announcers
American Hockey League broadcasters
National Hockey League broadcasters
North American Soccer League (1968–1984) commentators
Philadelphia Phantoms
Foster Hewitt Memorial Award winners
People from Cherry Hill, New Jersey
People from Pleasantville, New Jersey
Sportspeople from the Delaware Valley
Burials in New Jersey
St. Louis Blues announcers
Lacrosse announcers